The legislative districts of Rizal are the representations of the province of Rizal in the various national and local legislatures of the Philippines. At present, the province is represented in the House of Representatives of the Philippines by its four congressional districts, with the districts' representatives being elected every three years. Additionally, each district is allotted a certain number of seats in the Rizal Provincial Board, with board members also being elected every three years.

The component city of Antipolo is represented independently from the province by its own two districts, although it is also represented in the provincial board.

History 
Areas now under the jurisdiction of Rizal were represented under the at-large districts of the province of Manila and Morong in the Malolos Congress from 1898 to 1899.

Rizal, established in 1901, was initially divided into two representative districts from 1907 to 2022. From 1907 to 1972, the present-day municipality of Pateros and the cities of Caloocan, Las Piñas, Makati, Malabon, Mandaluyong, Marikina, Muntinlupa, Navotas, Parañaque, Pasay, Pasig, Quezon City, San Juan, and Taguig and, until 1998, Antipolo were part of its representation. When seats for the upper house of the Philippine Legislature were elected from territory-based districts between 1916 and 1935, Rizal formed part of the fourth senatorial district which elected two out of the 24-member senate.

In the disruption caused by World War II, Quezon City, Caloocan, Makati, Mandaluyong, Parañaque, Pasay, and San Juan were incorporated into the City of Greater Manila and were thus represented as part of the at-large district of Manila from 1942 to 1944. The province, meanwhile, was represented by two delegates in the National Assembly of the Japanese-sponsored Second Philippine Republic: one was an ex officio member, while the other was elected through a provincial assembly of KALIBAPI members during the Japanese occupation of the Philippines. Upon the restoration of the Philippine Commonwealth in 1945, the province retained its two pre-war representative districts; this remained so until 1972.

From 1978 to 1984, it was part of the representation of Region IV-A in the Interim Batasang Pambansa, and from 1984 to 1986, it elected two assemblymen at-large in the Regular Batasang Pambansa. It regained its two representative districts under the new Constitution which was proclaimed on February 11, 1987, and elected members to the restored House of Representatives starting that same year. The province has gained two additional legislative districts in 2021 by virtue of Republic Act No. 11533. The districts elected their first representatives in the 2022 Philippine general elections.

Current districts 

The province was last redistricted in 2021, wherein the province gained two seats in the house. The province's current congressional delegation composes of two members of the Nationalist People's Coalition, one member of the Liberal Party, and one member of Lakas-CMD. All four representatives are part of the majority bloc.

Historical districts

At-Large (1943–1944) 
 Excluding Caloocan, Makati, Mandaluyong, Quezon City, Parañaque, Pasay, San Juan

At-Large (1984-1986)

See also 
Legislative districts of Antipolo
Legislative districts of Caloocan
Legislative district of Las Piñas–Parañaque
Legislative districts of Makati
Legislative district of Malabon–Navotas–Valenzuela
Legislative district of Pasay
Legislative district of Pasig–Marikina
Legislative districts of Quezon City
Legislative district of San Juan–Mandaluyong
Legislative district of Taguig–Pateros–Muntinlupa

Notes

References 

Rizal
Politics of Rizal